Ulrik Pedersen (born 11 January 1974) is a Danish former footballer and coach, who was also formerly the sporting director of Kolding IF.

Career

During his active playing career, Pedersen played as a centre back for OB, Silkeborg and Kolding FC. For the former, he was part of the "Miracle in Madrid"-team which knocked out Real Madrid in the third round of the 1994–95 UEFA Cup.

In 2012, as head coach of FC Sydvest 05, Pedersen reached promotion to the Danish 2nd Division, the third highest division in Denmark.

He managed Middelfart G&BK for six months – between July 2014 and January 2015 – ; a chaotic period in which he was sent on Christmas holiday in mid-October after a disappointing start to the season. On 26 May 2016, Pedersen was presented as the new sporting director of Kolding IF, with whom he promoted to the Danish 1st Division (second highest division) in June 2019. After the promotion, he was released from his duties by Kolding IF.

References

1974 births
Living people
Danish men's footballers
Odense Boldklub players
Silkeborg IF players
Kolding FC players
Association football midfielders
Danish Superliga players
Footballers from Odense
Danish football managers
FC Sydvest 05 managers
Dalum IF players